

Events 
Lutenist and composer Robert Jones graduates from St Edmund Hall, Oxford.

Publications 
Gregor Aichinger – Third book of motets (Nuremberg: Paul Kauffmann)
Giammateo Asola –  for two choirs (Venice: Ricciardo Amadino)
Ippolito Baccusi – , for eight voices (Venice: Ricciardo Amadino), also includes two Magnificats
Adriano Banchieri
, first book of canzonettas for three voices (Venice: Ricciardo Amadino)
First book of madrigals for four voices (Venice)
Joachim a Burck –  (The Story of the Passion of Jesus Christ by the Evangelist St. Luke) for five voices (Mühlhausen: Hieronymous Reinhard)
Sethus Calvisius –  for four voices (Leipzig: Jacob Apel), a collection of Lutheran hymns
Giovanni Croce
 for eight voices (Venice: Giacomo Vincenti), contains psalms for Vespers
First book of motets for four voices (Venice: Giacomo Vincenti)
Girolamo Dalla Casa – First book of motets for six voices (Venice: Ricciardo Amadino)
John Dowland – The First Booke of Songes or Ayres of Foure Partes with tableture for the lute (London: Peter Short)
Johannes Eccard
 for five voices, in two volumes (Königsberg: Georg Osterberger)
 for eight voices (Königsberg, Georg Osterberger), a wedding song
  for six voices (Königsberg, Georg Osterberger), a wedding song
Giovanni Gabrieli – , Book 1, for six to sixteen voices and instruments (Venice: Angelo Gardano)
Jacobus Gallus –  for four, five, six, eight, and more voices (Nuremberg: Alexander Philipp Dieterich), a collection of motets, published posthumously
Bartholomäus Gesius
 for four voices (Frankfurt an der Oder: Andreas Eichorn)
 for ten voices (Frankfurt an der Oder: Andreas Eichorn), a graduation motet
Anthony Holborne – Cittarn Schoole (London: Peter Short), a collection of songs for the cittern
George Kirbye – The first set Of English Madrigalls, to 4. 5. & 6. voyces (London: Thomas Este)
Giovanni de Macque – Third book of madrigals for five voices (Ferrara: Vittorio Baldini)
Simone Molinaro – First book of motets for five voices and masses for ten voices (Venice: Giacomo Vincenti)
Thomas Morley
A Plaine and Easie Introduction to Practicall Musicke
Canzonets, or little short aers to five and sixe voices (London: Peter Short)
Pietro Pace –  (Venice: Ricciardo Amadino)
Asprilio Pacelli – First book of motets and psalms to eight voices (Rome: Nicolo Mutii)
Orfeo Vecchi
First book of masses for four voices (Milan: Francesco & the heirs of Simon Tini)
First book of motets for five voices (Milan: the heirs of Francesco and Simon Tini)
Orazio Vecchi
Canzonette a3
L'Amfiparnasso, a madrigal comedy

Classical music

Opera 
Jacopo Peri – Dafne, the earliest known opera

Births 
July 22 – Virgilio Mazzocchi, Italian composer of oratorios (died 1646)
date unknown
Andreas Düben, organist and composer (died 1662)
Luigi Rossi, Italian composer of cantatas (died 1653)

Deaths 
January 29 – Elias Ammerbach, organist (b. c.1530)
June 6 – William Hunnis, poet, dramatist, and composer
October 7 – Francesco Rovigo, organist and composer (b. c.1540)

 
Music
16th century in music
Music by year